SR² Motorsports was a team that competed in the NASCAR Nationwide Series. The team fielded the No. 00 Toyota Camry for Jason White, and the No. 24 Toyota Camry for various drivers. The team was shut down after rising cost of NASCAR to be competitive in the series.

History 
 Car No. 00 history 

SR² Motorsports ran a second car, the No. 00, for Angela Cope at Charlotte in May. She finished 36th. Derek White drove the No. 00 in Watkins Glen, but did not qualify. Blake Koch drove the car for the second part of the season as a start and park, but was replaced for 3 races by Michael McDowell, Tanner Berryhill, and Angela Cope

In 2013, Jason White drove the first five races of the season the No. 00 Toyota. Michael McDowell drove for the team at Texas I, and Richmond I. Ken Butler III and Bryan Silas drove the car one race each. Actually, Blake Koch drove for the No. 00 team. The No. 00 team was fielded as a start and park team to help fund the No. 24 car, starting at 5-Hour Energy 200 at Dover at first of June 2013.

Car No. 00 results 

 Car No. 24 history 

SR² Motorsports was founded in 2012, making its debut in the Nationwide Series with the No. 24 Toyota in the 2012 DRIVE4COPD 300 at Daytona International Speedway with Benny Gordon, finishing 12th. In 2012, Benny drove the car for 11 races. Casey Roderick drove the car in 5 races, David Starr in 3 races, Derek White in 4 races. Angela and Amber Cope, Tim Bainey Jr., Tanner Berryhill, Blake Koch, Jamie Mosley, Tim Connoly, Scott Saunders, John Wes Townley and Kenny Wallace each drove the car for one race apiece.  The best finishes was a 12th at Daytona with Benny Gordon, and at Talladega with a 15th with John Wes Townley, and the team finished 28th in owner standings at the end of the 2012 season.

For 2013, Blake Koch returned to SR² Motorsports, for a full season in the No. 24 Toyota. He drove the car for the first seven races before switching to the 00. Various drivers drove for the No. 24 team, including Jason White, Brett Butler, and Ken Butler III and as of late, Ryan Ellis.

Harrison Rhodes drove the No. 24 in 2014 in a limited schedule starting at Daytona International Speedway.

Car No. 24 results 

 Car No. 27 history 

The No. 27 Toyota made its debut at the Jeff Foxworthy's Grit Chips 300 at Bristol Motor Speedway in 2013, with Michael McDowell. It was primarily run as a start and park car.

Car No. 27 results

References

External links
 
 

Defunct NASCAR teams
Companies based in North Carolina
2012 establishments in North Carolina